Rachel Lam Hei-tung (born 16 October 1984) is a Hong Kong model, actress, presenter and screenwriter. She wrote and co-starred in The Merger (2015) where the film garnered 27 awards in numerous film festivals.

In 2015, Lam and Tony Wong established their own film company Global Saga.

Education
In 2006, Lam graduated from The Hong Kong Academy for Performing Arts with a major in acting.

Filmography

Films

Television

References

External links
 
 
 
 
 Rachel Lam on Sina Weibo
 Rachel Lam on Instagram

Living people
Hong Kong film actresses
Hong Kong television actresses
21st-century Hong Kong actresses
Alumni of The Hong Kong Academy for Performing Arts
1984 births